Northwick Park is a large green public park between Harrow and Kenton in north-west London, forming part of the London Borough of Brent. Most of the park consists of playing fields. It is also the name of the electoral ward of Brent that covers the park, the area around its namesake station, and most of North Wembley.

The park was originally an estate as part of Sheepcote Farm in the manor of Harrow, and named after its lord, Northwick. The Middlesex County Council acquired 192 acres of land in the 1930s to plant trees and create a landscape to the existing hedges. The amount of public open space has since diminished, partly due to the building of Northwick Park Hospital, a major NHS hospital. Later in 2006, a major privately owned golf course called Playgolf Northwick Park was opened, which has been voted number one 9-hole golf course in the UK in 2009 by National Golfers Magazine. Until World War II, there was a previous golf course there at the land now covered by the Harrow campus of the University of Westminster.

From 1987 to 1991, there were proposals to change local authority borders which included transferring Northwick Park to the London Borough of Harrow, which was objected to by Brent London Borough Council. The proposals were eventually rejected.

Today, Northwick Park includes nine standard pitches, three cricket pitches, two Gaelic football pitches, two flying areas and eight softball areas. The park also consists of a 1,133 square metre pavilion - a single storey brick building constructed circa 1950 with a hall, ancillary area for sports, and dedicated car park. The pavilion has also been hired for filming.

To the west of Northwick Park, across Watford Road, is the Harrow School Playing Fields.

Gallery

References

Parks and open spaces in the London Borough of Brent